Carlos di Laura and Marcelo Filippini were the defending champions, but none competed this year.

Peter Ballauff and Rüdiger Haas won the title by defeating Goran Ivanišević and Diego Nargiso 6–2, 6–7, 6–4 in the final.

Seeds

Draw

Draw

References

External links
 Official results archive (ATP)
 Official results archive (ITF)

Campionati Internazionali di Sicilia
1989 Grand Prix (tennis)
Camp